Donnybrook Fair was a fair that was held in Donnybrook, Dublin, from the 13th century until the 1850s. It has given its name to an Irish jig, a chain of food stores, a broadsheet ballad, and is a slang term for a brawl or riot.

History
In the year 1204 King John of England granted a licence to the corporation of Dublin to hold an annual eight-day fair in Donnybrook. 

In 1252 the duration was extended to fifteen days. Over the years the terms of holding the fair changed slightly, until in the 18th century it was held on 26 August on Donnybrook Green for a fortnight (14 days).

By the beginning of the 19th century the fair had become more a site of public entertainment and drinking than a fair proper, and many attempts were made to have it abolished. However, the licence-holder had by law the right to hold the fair and refused to bow to public pressure.

The licence had been passed from Henry Ussher (died 1756) to William Wolsey, who leased it in 1778 to John Madden and then sold it to him in 1812. A committee, The Committee for the Abolition of Donnybrook Fair, was established to acquire the licence in order to put an end to it, and it was finally bought from John and Peter Madden in 1855 for £3,000, under the auspices of the Lord Mayor of Dublin, Joseph Boyce.

Song

A broadside ballad called "The Humours of Donnybrook Fair" dates from the 18th century, author unknown. It was recorded by Tommy Makem.

 To Donnybrook steer, all you sons of Parnassus
 Poor painters, poor poets, poor newsmen, poor knaves
 To see what the fun is that all fun surpasses
 The sorrow and sadness of green Erin's slaves
 O Donnybrook, jewel, full of mirth is your quiver
 Where all flock from Dublin to gape and to stare
 At two elegant bridges, without e'er a river
 So success to the humours of Donnybrook Fair

Jig
The popular Irish double-jig known as "Donnybrook Fair" is also called "The Humours of Donnybrook" or "The Humours of Donnybrook Fair".

Retail chain
The term "Donnybrook Fair" is used as a brand by a chain of food retail stores which was founded in 1999 and acquired by the Musgrave Group in 2018. One of the chain's first stores, in Donnybrook village, was opened 500 metres from the site of the original fair in Donnybrook.

References

History of Dublin (city)
Fairs in Ireland